Priscilla Joyce Ford (February 10, 1929 – January 29, 2005) was an American mass murderer who was sentenced to death after driving her 1974 blue Lincoln Continental down a sidewalk in downtown Reno, Nevada on Thanksgiving Day in 1980. The attack killed six people and injured 23 more. Ford had been diagnosed as having paranoid schizophrenia with violent tendencies, she had been treated and released by seven different hospitals before moving to Reno in 1980. Ford launched numerous appeals against her death sentence, all of which failed. A heavy smoker with emphysema, she died at the age of 75.

Ford's blood-alcohol ratio was .162, above the limit to legally drive. During the 100-foot drive, Ford drove as fast as 40 miles per hour. Ford did not resist when police asked her to exit her car. Officer Oakes, who was an officer at the crime scene, stated that Ford was remarkably calm. When she asked Oakes how many people she killed, he responded, "five or six," and she replied back, "good". Another officer stated that Ford said, "The more dead, the better," while she was in custody.

On August 4, 1981, Ford was found competent to stand trial after being found incompetent on January 29 of that year. The trial lasted almost five months. After 13 hours of deliberation, a jury composed of seven women and five men found Ford guilty on six counts of murder and 23 counts of attempted murder on March 19, 1982. On March 28, 1982, the jury decided she was to be put to death.  Ford's lawyer claimed she was mentally ill with schizophrenia and should not be put to death, rather spend the rest of her life in a mental institution, while the District Attorney called her "evil personified" and fought for Ford to be found legally sane. Ford herself went on the stand and testified that she believed she was the reincarnation of Jesus and therefore incapable of sin.

The murders were not her only interaction with law enforcement during her life. In 1957, Ford shot her second husband in self-defense before turning the gun on herself. Ford was also arrested for trespassing and assault when her daughter was eleven. Ford, a heavy smoker, died of emphysema aged 75 at Southern Nevada Women's Correctional Center in North Las Vegas, Nevada on January 29, 2005.

References

1929 births
2005 deaths
American female murderers
American mass murderers
American prisoners sentenced to death
Deaths from emphysema
Murders by motor vehicle
People convicted of murder by Nevada
People with schizophrenia
Prisoners sentenced to death by Nevada
Prisoners who died in Nevada detention
Vehicular rampage in the United States
20th-century American educators
1980 murders in the United States
20th-century African-American people
Massacres in the United States
Massacres in 1980
Women sentenced to death